Lithium orotate (C5H3LiN2O4) is a salt of orotic acid and lithium. It is available as the monohydrate, LiC5H3N2O4·H2O.  In this compound, lithium is non-covalently bound to an orotate ion, rather than to a carbonate or other ion, and like other salts, dissociates in solution to produce free lithium ions. It is marketed as a dietary supplement, though it has been researched minimally between 1973–1986 to treat certain medical conditions, such as alcoholism and Alzheimer's disease.

While lithium orotate is capable of providing lithium to the body, like lithium carbonate and other lithium salts, there are no systematic reviews supporting the efficacy of lithium orotate and it is not approved by the U.S. Food and Drug Administration (FDA) for the treatment of any medical condition.

Effectiveness
In 1973, Hans Nieper reported that lithium orotate contained 3.83 mg of elemental lithium per 100 mg and lithium carbonate contained 18.8 mg of elemental lithium per 100 mg. Nieper went on to claim that lithium did not dissolve from the orotate carrier until it passed through the blood–brain barrier; however, a 1976 study documented that lithium concentrations within the brains of rats were not statistically different between equivalent dosages of lithium from lithium orotate, lithium carbonate, or lithium chloride. However, another study in 1978 study showed that eight hours after intraperitoneal injections brain lithium concentrations of rats were significantly greater after lithium orotate than after lithium carbonate. While little serum lithium remained at 24 h after injection of 2·0 m equiv kg−1 lithium carbonate, two‐thirds of the 2 h serum lithium concentration was present 24 h after lithium orotate. Furthermore, the 24 h brain concentration of lithium after lithium orotate was approximately three times greater than that after lithium carbonate. These data suggest the possibility that lower doses of lithium orotate than lithium carbonate may achieve therapeutic brain lithium concentrations and relatively stable serum concentrations. A year later, Smith and Schou repeated the experiment at a higher dose (2 mM Li+) and found that the higher concentrations in the brain could be possibly accounted for by decreased renal function in rats treated with lithium orotate. The proponents of lithium orotate have since criticized the results by citing the fact that the dose of lithium orotate used in the study was in the toxic range. In 2022, Pacholko redid the experiment and showed lithium orotate to have a safer kidney profile than lithium carbonate, it also showed that both had an increased TSH only in females, but the increase was lower in the orotate group.

The pharmacokinetics of lithium orotate in human brains is poorly documented, and there is no known mechanism by which orotate ions could alter the pharmacokinetics of dissociated lithium ions. Major medical research has not been conducted on lithium orotate since the 1980s. As previously stated, lithium intake appears to be effective even at low doses, and this may account for lithium orotates claimed effectiveness.

Safety
Preliminary studies seem to indicate that lithium orotate is safe; a 6 month alcoholism cessation study led to only minor adverse effects in 8 out of 42 patients. However, the lack of safety studies and the OTC status raises concerns. Attention to it was specially raised in medical literature after a case report of an 18 year old woman who required medical attention after taking an overdose of a lithium orotate supplement. She was discharged after treatment.

Orotic acid can be mutagenic in very high doses of 50 mg/kg in mammalian somatic cells. It is also mutagenic for bacteria and yeast. Although lithium orotate was not shown to be genotoxic, short and long term studies must be performed to guarantee public safety.

See also 
 Lithium (medication)
 Lithium carbonate
 Lithium citrate
 Lithium aspartate

References

External links 
 

Alternative medical treatments
Lithium compounds
Mood stabilizers
Organolithium compounds